The Himalayan pika (Ochotona himalayana) is a species of small mammal in the pika family (Ochotonidae). It is found at high altitudes in remote areas of Ladakh, Uttarakhand and possibly also in Nepal &Tibet. The IUCN has listed this species as being of "least concern".

Taxonomy
The Himalayan pika was first described by Feng in 1973. Before that it was thought to by synonymous with Royle's pika (Ochotona roylei) and it is found wholly within the range of that species. However, molecular studies by Yu et al. (2000) confirmed that it was a separate species. There are no recognised subspecies.

Distribution and habitat

There have been claims that it is present in Nepal on the southern side of the mountain range but this has not been authenticated. The typical habitat of this species is rocky places, screes, walls and cliffs in the vicinity of coniferous forests.

Behaviour
It is particularly active early in the morning and again at nightfall and feeds on various types of plant material. It produces litters of three or four young.

Status
The Himalayan pika lives in remote mountainous areas where it has little association with man. No particular threats have been identified and the International Union for Conservation of Nature list it as being of "least concern". The IUCN advocates that more research should be undertaken on its ecology and population status.

References

Himalayan pika
Fauna of Eastern Himalaya
Fauna of Tibet
Himalayan pika
Taxonomy articles created by Polbot
Taxobox binomials not recognized by IUCN